Seamus Justin Heaney  (13 April 1939 – 30 August 2013) was an Irish poet, playwright and translator. He received the 1995 Nobel Prize in Literature. Among his best-known works is Death of a Naturalist (1966), his first major published volume. Heaney was and is still recognised as one of the principal contributors to poetry in Ireland during his lifetime. American poet Robert Lowell described him as "the most important Irish poet since Yeats", and many others, including the academic John Sutherland, have said that he was "the greatest poet of our age". Robert Pinsky has stated that "with his wonderful gift of eye and ear Heaney has the gift of the story-teller." Upon his death in 2013, The Independent described him as "probably the best-known poet in the world".

Heaney was born in the townland of Tamniaran between Castledawson and Toomebridge, Northern Ireland. His family moved to nearby Bellaghy when he was a boy. He became a lecturer at St. Joseph's College in Belfast in the early 1960s, after attending Queen's University and began to publish poetry. He lived in Sandymount, Dublin, from 1976 until his death. He lived part-time in the United States from 1981 to 2006.

Heaney was a professor at Harvard from 1981 to 1997, and its Poet in Residence from 1988 to 2006. From 1989 to 1994, he was also the Professor of Poetry at Oxford. In 1996 he was made a Commandeur of the Ordre des Arts et des Lettres and in 1998 was bestowed the title Saoi of the Aosdána. Other awards that he received include the Geoffrey Faber Memorial Prize (1968), the E. M. Forster Award (1975), the PEN Translation Prize (1985), the Golden Wreath of Poetry (2001), the T. S. Eliot Prize (2006) and two Whitbread Prizes (1996 and 1999). In 2011, he was awarded the Griffin Poetry Prize and in 2012, a Lifetime Recognition Award from the Griffin Trust.

Heaney is buried at the Cemetery of St Mary's Church, Bellaghy, Northern Ireland. The headstone bears the epitaph "Walk on air against your better judgement", from one of his poems, "The Gravel Walks".

Early life 

Heaney was born on 13 April 1939, at the family farmhouse called Mossbawn, between Castledawson and Toomebridge; he was the first of nine children. In 1953, his family moved to Bellaghy, a few miles away, which is now the family home. His father was Patrick Heaney (d. October 1986), a farmer and cattle dealer, and the eighth child of ten born to James and Sarah Heaney. Patrick was introduced to cattle dealing by his uncles, who raised him after his parents' early deaths. Heaney's mother was Margaret Kathleen McCann (1911–1984), whose relatives worked at a local linen mill. Heaney remarked on the inner tension between the rural Gaelic past exemplified by his father and the industrialized Ulster exemplified by his mother.

Heaney attended Anahorish Primary School, and won a scholarship to St Columb's College, a Roman Catholic boarding school in Derry, when he was twelve years old. While studying at St Columb's, Heaney's younger brother Christopher was killed in February 1953 at the age of four in a road accident. The poems "Mid-Term Break" and "The Blackbird of Glanmore" are related to his brother's death.

Heaney played Gaelic football for Castledawson GAC, the club in the area of his birth, as a boy, and did not change to Bellaghy when his family moved there. However, he has remarked that he became involved culturally with Bellaghy GAA Club from his late teens, acting in amateur plays and composing treasure hunts for the Club.

Career

1957–1969

Heaney studied English Language and Literature at Queen's University Belfast starting in 1957. While there, he found a copy of Ted Hughes's Lupercal, which spurred him to write poetry. "Suddenly, the matter of contemporary poetry was the material of my own life," he said. He graduated in 1961 with a First Class Honours degree.

Heaney studied for a teacher certification at St Joseph's Teacher Training College in Belfast (now merged with St Mary's, University College), and began teaching at St Thomas' Secondary Intermediate School in Ballymurphy, Belfast. The headmaster of this school was the writer Michael McLaverty from County Monaghan, who introduced Heaney to the poetry of Patrick Kavanagh. With McLaverty's mentorship, Heaney first started to publish poetry in 1962. Sophia Hillan describes how McLaverty was like a foster father to the younger Belfast poet. In the introduction to McLaverty's Collected Works, Heaney summarised the poet's contribution and influence: "His voice was modestly pitched, he never sought the limelight, yet for all that, his place in our literature is secure." Heaney's poem "Fosterage", in the sequence "Singing School", from North (1975), is dedicated to him.

In 1963 Heaney began lecturing at St Joseph's, and joined the Belfast Group, a poets' workshop organized by Philip Hobsbaum, then an English lecturer at Queen's University. Through this, Heaney met other Belfast poets, including Derek Mahon and Michael Longley.

Heaney met Marie Devlin, a native of Ardboe, County Tyrone, while at St Joseph's in 1962; they married in August 1965. A school teacher and writer, Devlin published Over Nine Waves (1994), a collection of traditional Irish myths and legends. Heaney's first book, Eleven Poems, was published in November 1965 for the Queen's University Festival. In 1966, their first son, Michael, was born. A second son, Christopher, was born in 1968.

Heaney's first major volume, Death of a Naturalist, was published in 1966 by Faber and Faber. This collection was met with much critical acclaim and won several awards, including the Gregory Award for Young Writers and the Geoffrey Faber Prize. The same year, he was appointed as a lecturer in Modern English Literature at Queen's University Belfast. In 1968, Heaney and Michael Longley undertook a reading tour called Room to Rhyme, which increased awareness of the poet's work. The following year, he published his second major volume, Door into the Dark.

1970–1984

Heaney taught as a visiting professor in English at the University of California, Berkeley in the 1970–1971 academic year. In 1972, he left his lectureship at Belfast, moved to Wicklow in the Republic of Ireland, and began writing on a full-time basis. That year, he published his third collection, Wintering Out. In 1975, Heaney's next volume, North, was published. A pamphlet of prose poems entitled Stations was published the same year.

In 1976 Heaney was appointed Head of English at Carysfort College in Dublin and moved with his family to the suburb of Sandymount. His next collection, Field Work, was published in 1979. Selected Poems 1965-1975 and Preoccupations: Selected Prose 1968–1978 were published in 1980. When Aosdána, the national Irish Arts Council, was established in 1981, Heaney was among those elected into its first group. (He was subsequently elected a Saoi, one of its five elders and its highest honour, in 1997).

Also in 1981 Heaney traveled to the United States as a visiting professor at Harvard, where he was affiliated with Adams House. He was awarded two honorary doctorates, from Queen's University and from Fordham University in New York City (1982). At the Fordham commencement ceremony on 23 May 1982, Heaney delivered his address as a 46-stanza poem entitled "Verses for a Fordham Commencement."

Born and educated in Northern Ireland, Heaney stressed that he was Irish and not British. Following the success of the Field Day Theatre Company's production of Brian Friel's Translations, the founders Brian Friel and Stephen Rea decided to make the company a permanent group. Heaney joined the company's expanded Board of Directors in 1981. In autumn 1984, his mother, Margaret, died.

1985–1999

Heaney became a tenured faculty member at Harvard, as the Boylston Professor of Rhetoric and Oratory (formerly Visiting Professor) 1985–1997, and the Ralph Waldo Emerson Poet in Residence at Harvard 1998–2006. In 1986, Heaney received a Litt.D. from Bates College. His father, Patrick, died in October the same year. The loss of both parents within two years affected Heaney deeply, and he expressed his grief in poems. In 1988, a collection of his critical essays, The Government of the Tongue, was published.

In 1985 Heaney wrote the poem "From the Republic of Conscience" at the request of Amnesty International Ireland. He wanted to "celebrate United Nations Day and the work of Amnesty". The poem inspired the title of Amnesty International's highest honour, the Ambassador of Conscience Award.

In 1988 Heaney donated his lecture notes to the Rare Book Library of Emory University in Atlanta, Georgia, after giving the notable  there.

In 1989 Heaney was elected Oxford Professor of Poetry, which he held for a five-year term to 1994. The chair does not require residence in Oxford. Throughout this period, he was dividing his time between Ireland and the United States. He also continued to give public readings. So well attended and keenly anticipated were these events that those who queued for tickets with such enthusiasm were sometimes dubbed "Heaneyboppers", suggesting an almost teenybopper fan base.

In 1990 The Cure at Troy, a play based on Sophocles's Philoctetes, was published. The next year, he published another volume of poetry, Seeing Things (1991). Heaney was named an Honorary Patron of the University Philosophical Society, Trinity College Dublin, and was elected an Honorary Fellow of the Royal Society of Literature (1991).

In 1993 Heaney guest-edited The Mays Anthology, a collection of new writing from students at the University of Oxford and University of Cambridge. That same year, he was awarded the Dickinson College Arts Award and returned to the Pennsylvania college to deliver the commencement address and receive an honorary degree. He was scheduled to return to Dickinson again to receive the Harold and Ethel L. Stellfox Award—for a major literary figure—at the time of his death in 2013. Irish poet Paul Muldoon was named recipient of the award that year, partly in recognition of the close connection between the two poets.

Heaney was awarded the Nobel Prize in Literature in 1995 for "works of lyrical beauty and ethical depth, which exalt everyday miracles and the living past". He was on holiday in Greece with his wife when the news broke. Neither journalists nor his own children could reach him until he arrived at Dublin Airport two days later, although an Irish television camera traced him to Kalamata. Asked how he felt to have his name added to the Irish Nobel pantheon of W. B. Yeats, George Bernard Shaw and Samuel Beckett, Heaney responded: "It's like being a little foothill at the bottom of a mountain range. You hope you just live up to it. It's extraordinary." He and his wife Marie were immediately taken from the airport to Áras an Uachtaráin for champagne with President Mary Robinson. He would refer to the prize discreetly as "the N thing" in personal exchanges with others.

Heaney's 1996 collection The Spirit Level won the Whitbread Book of the Year Award; he repeated the success in 1999 with Beowulf: A New Verse Translation.

Heaney was elected a Member of the Royal Irish Academy in 1996 and was admitted in 1997. In the same year, Heaney was elected Saoi of Aosdána. In 1998, Heaney was elected Honorary Fellow of Trinity College Dublin.

2000s

In 2000, Heaney was awarded an honorary doctorate and delivered the commencement address at the University of Pennsylvania. In 2002, Heaney was awarded an honorary doctorate from Rhodes University and delivered a public lecture on "The Guttural Muse".

In 2003, the Seamus Heaney Centre for Poetry was opened at Queen's University Belfast. It houses the Heaney Media Archive, a record of Heaney's entire oeuvre, along with a full catalogue of his radio and television presentations. That same year, Heaney decided to lodge a substantial portion of his literary archive at Emory University as a memorial to the work of William M. Chace, the university's recently retired president. The Emory papers represented the largest repository of Heaney's work (1964–2003). He donated these to help build their large existing archive of material from Irish writers including Yeats, Paul Muldoon, Ciaran Carson, Michael Longley and other members of the Belfast Group.

In 2003, when asked if there was any figure in popular culture who aroused interest in poetry and lyrics, Heaney praised American rap artist Eminem from Detroit, saying, "He has created a sense of what is possible. He has sent a voltage around a generation. He has done this not just through his subversive attitude but also his verbal energy." Heaney wrote the poem "Beacons at Bealtaine" to mark the 2004 EU Enlargement. He read the poem at a ceremony for the 25 leaders of the enlarged European Union, arranged by the Irish EU presidency.

In August 2006, Heaney suffered a stroke. Although he recovered and joked, "Blessed are the pacemakers" when fitted with a heart monitor, he cancelled all public engagements for several months. He was in County Donegal at the time of the 75th birthday of Anne Friel, wife of playwright Brian Friel. He read the works of Henning Mankell, Donna Leon and Robert Harris while in hospital. Among his visitors was former President Bill Clinton.

Heaney's District and Circle won the 2006 T. S. Eliot Prize. In 2008, he became artist of honour in Østermarie, Denmark, and Seamus Heaney Stræde (street) was named after him. In 2009, Heaney was presented with an Honorary-Life Membership award from the University College Dublin (UCD) Law Society, in recognition of his remarkable role as a literary figure.

Faber and Faber published Dennis O'Driscoll's book Stepping Stones: Interviews with Seamus Heaney in 2008; this has been described as the nearest thing to an autobiography of Heaney. In 2009, Heaney was awarded the David Cohen Prize for Literature. He recorded a spoken word album, over 12 hours long, of himself reading his poetry collections to commemorate his 70th birthday, which occurred on 13 April 2009.

2010s
He spoke at the West Belfast Festival in July 2010 in celebration of his mentor, the poet and novelist Michael McLaverty, who had helped Heaney to first publish his poetry.

In September 2010, Faber published Human Chain, Heaney's twelfth collection. Human Chain was awarded the Forward Poetry Prize for Best Collection, one of the major poetry prizes Heaney had never previously won, despite having been twice shortlisted. The book, published 44 years after the poet's first, was inspired in part by Heaney's stroke in 2006, which left him "babyish" and "on the brink". Poet and Forward judge Ruth Padel described the work as "a collection of painful, honest and delicately weighted poems ... a wonderful and humane achievement." Writer Colm Tóibín described Human Chain as "his best single volume for many years, and one that contains some of the best poems he has written... is a book of shades and memories, of things whispered, of journeys into the underworld, of elegies and translations, of echoes and silences." In October 2010, the collection was shortlisted for the T. S. Eliot Prize.

Heaney was named one of "Britain's top 300 intellectuals" by The Observer in 2011, though the newspaper later published a correction acknowledging that "several individuals who would not claim to be British" had been featured, of which Heaney was one. That same year, he contributed translations of Old Irish marginalia for Songs of the Scribe, an album by Traditional Singer in Residence of the Seamus Heaney Centre for Poetry, Pádraigín Ní Uallacháin.

In December 2011, he donated his personal literary notes to the National Library of Ireland. Even though he admitted he would likely have earned a fortune by auctioning them, Heaney personally packed up the boxes of notes and drafts and, accompanied by his son Michael, delivered them to the National Library.

In June 2012, Heaney accepted the Griffin Trust for Excellence in Poetry's Lifetime Recognition Award and gave a speech in honour of the award.

Heaney was compiling a collection of his work in anticipation of Selected Poems 1988–2013 at the time of his death. The selection includes poems and writings from Seeing Things, The Spirit Level, the translation of Beowulf, Electric Light, District and Circle, and Human Chain (fall 2014).

In February 2014, Emory University premiered Seamus Heaney: The Music of What Happens, the first major exhibition to celebrate the life and work of Seamus Heaney since his death.
 The exhibit holds a display of the surface of Heaney's personal writing desk that he used in the 1980s as well as old photographs and personal correspondence with other writers.
Heaney died in August 2013, during the exhibition's curatorial process. Though the exhibit's original vision to celebrate Heaney's life and work remains at the forefront, there is a small section commemorating his death and its influence.

In September 2015, it was announced that Heaney's family would posthumously publish his translation of Book VI of The Aeneid in 2016.

Death
Seamus Heaney died in the Blackrock Clinic in Dublin on 30 August 2013, aged 74, following a short illness. After a fall outside a restaurant in Dublin, he entered hospital for a medical procedure, but died at 7:30 the following morning before it took place. His funeral was held in Donnybrook, Dublin, on the morning of 2 September 2013, and he was buried in the evening at his home village of Bellaghy, in the same graveyard as his parents, young brother, and other family members. His son Michael revealed at the funeral mass that his father texted his final words, "Noli timere" (Latin: "Be not afraid"), to his wife, Marie, minutes before he died.

His funeral was broadcast live the following day on RTÉ television and radio and was streamed internationally at RTÉ's website. RTÉ Radio 1 Extra transmitted a continuous broadcast, from 8 a.m. to 9:15 p.m. on the day of the funeral, of his Collected Poems album, recorded by Heaney in 2009. His poetry collections sold out rapidly in Irish bookshops immediately following his death.

Many tributes were paid to Heaney. President Michael D. Higgins said: 
...we in Ireland will once again get a sense of the depth and range of the contribution of Seamus Heaney to our contemporary world, but what those of us who have had the privilege of his friendship and presence will miss is the extraordinary depth and warmth of his personality...Generations of Irish people will have been familiar with Seamus' poems. Scholars all over the world will have gained from the depth of the critical essays, and so many rights organisations will want to thank him for all the solidarity he gave to the struggles within the republic of conscience.President Higgins also appeared live from Áras an Uachtaráin on the Nine O'Clock News in a five-minute segment in which he paid tribute to Seamus Heaney.

Bill Clinton, former President of the United States, said: 
Both his stunning work and his life were a gift to the world. His mind, heart, and his uniquely Irish gift for language made him our finest poet of the rhythms of ordinary lives and a powerful voice for peace...His wonderful work, like that of his fellow Irish Nobel Prize winners Shaw, Yeats, and Beckett, will be a lasting gift for all the world.

José Manuel Barroso, European Commission president, said: 
I am greatly saddened today to learn of the death of Seamus Heaney, one of the great European poets of our lifetime. ... The strength, beauty and character of his words will endure for generations to come and were rightly recognised with the Nobel Prize for Literature.Harvard University issued a statement: We are fortunate and proud to have counted Seamus Heaney as a revered member of the Harvard family. For us, as for people around the world, he epitomised the poet as a wellspring of humane insight and artful imagination, subtle wisdom and shining grace. We will remember him with deep affection and admiration.

Poet Michael Longley, a close friend of Heaney, said: "I feel like I've lost a brother." Thomas Kinsella said he was shocked, but John Montague said he had known for some time that the poet was not well. Playwright Frank McGuinness called Heaney "the greatest Irishman of my generation: he had no rivals." Colm Tóibín wrote: "In a time of burnings and bombings Heaney used poetry to offer an alternative world." Gerald Dawe said he was "like an older brother who encouraged you to do the best you could do". Theo Dorgan said, "[Heaney's] work will pass into permanence. Everywhere I go there is real shock at this. Seamus was one of us." His publisher, Faber and Faber, noted that "his impact on literary culture is immeasurable." Playwright Tom Stoppard said, "Seamus never had a sour moment, neither in person nor on paper". Andrew Motion, a former UK Poet Laureate and friend of Heaney, called him "a great poet, a wonderful writer about poetry, and a person of truly exceptional grace and intelligence."

Many memorial events were held, including a commemoration at Emory University, Harvard University, Oxford University and the Southbank Centre, London. Leading US poetry organisations also met in New York to commemorate the death.

Work

Naturalism
At one time, Heaney's books made up two-thirds of the sales of living poets in the UK. His work often deals with the local surroundings of Ireland, particularly in Northern Ireland, where he was born and lived until young adulthood. Speaking of his early life and education, he commented, "I learned that my local County Derry experience, which I had considered archaic and irrelevant to 'the modern world', was to be trusted. They taught me that trust and helped me to articulate it." Death of a Naturalist (1966) and Door into the Dark (1969) mostly focus on the details of rural, parochial life.

In a number of volumes, beginning with Door into the Dark (1969) and Wintering Out (1972), Heaney also spent a significant amount of time writing on the northern Irish bog. Particularly of note is the collection of bog body poems in North (1975), featuring mangled bodies preserved in the bog. In a review by Ciaran Carson, he said that the bog poems made Heaney into "the laureate of violence—a mythmaker, an anthropologist of ritual killing...the world of megalithic doorways and charming noble barbarity." Poems such as "Bogland" and "Bog Queen" addressed political struggles directly for the first time.

Politics
Allusions to sectarian difference, widespread in Northern Ireland through his lifetime, can be found in his poems. His books Wintering Out (1973) and North (1975) seek to interweave commentary on the Troubles with a historical context and wider human experience. While some critics accused Heaney of being "an apologist and a mythologiser" of the violence, Blake Morrison suggests the poet has written poems directly about the Troubles as well as elegies for friends and acquaintances who have died in them; he has tried to discover a historical framework in which to interpret the current unrest; and he has taken on the mantle of public spokesman, someone looked to for comment and guidance... Yet he has also shown signs of deeply resenting this role, defending the right of poets to be private and apolitical, and questioning the extent to which poetry, however "committed", can influence the course of history.

Shaun O'Connell in the New Boston Review notes that "those who see Seamus Heaney as a symbol of hope in a troubled land are not, of course, wrong to do so, though they may be missing much of the undercutting complexities of his poetry, the backwash of ironies which make him as bleak as he is bright." O'Connell notes in his Boston Review critique of Station Island: 
Again and again Heaney pulls back from political purposes; despite its emblems of savagery, Station Island lends no rhetorical comfort to Republicanism. Politic about politics, Station Island is less about a united Ireland than about a poet seeking religious and aesthetic unity.

Heaney is described by critic Terry Eagleton as "an enlightened cosmopolitan liberal", refusing to be drawn. Eagleton suggests: "When the political is introduced... it is only in the context of what Heaney will or will not say." Reflections on what Heaney identifies as "tribal conflict" favour the description of people's lives and their voices, drawing out the "psychic landscape". His collections often recall the assassinations of his family members and close friends, lynchings and bombings. Colm Tóibín wrote, "throughout his career there have been poems of simple evocation and description. His refusal to sum up or offer meaning is part of his tact."

Heaney published "Requiem for the Croppies", a poem that commemorates the Irish rebels of 1798, on the 50th anniversary of the 1916 Easter Rising. He read the poem to both Catholic and Protestant audiences in Ireland. He commented, "To read 'Requiem for the Croppies' wasn't to say ‘up the IRA’ or anything. It was silence-breaking rather than rabble-rousing." He stated, "You don't have to love it. You just have to permit it."

He turned down the offer of laureateship of the United Kingdom, partly for political reasons, commenting, "I’ve nothing against the Queen personally: I had lunch at the Palace once upon a time." He stated that his "cultural starting point" was "off-centre". A much-quoted statement was when he objected to being included in The Penguin Book of Contemporary British Poetry (1982). Although he was born in Northern Ireland, his response to being included in the British anthology was delivered in his poem "An Open Letter":
Don't be surprised if I demur, for, be advised
My passport's green.
No glass of ours was ever raised
To toast The Queen.

Translation
He was concerned, as a poet and a translator, with the English language as it is spoken in Ireland but also as spoken elsewhere and in other times; he explored Anglo-Saxon influences in his work and study. Critic W. S. Di Piero noted Whatever the occasion, childhood, farm life, politics and culture in Northern Ireland, other poets past and present, Heaney strikes time and again at the taproot of language, examining its genetic structures, trying to discover how it has served, in all its changes, as a culture bearer, a world to contain imaginations, at once a rhetorical weapon and nutriment of spirit. He writes of these matters with rare discrimination and resourcefulness, and a winning impatience with received wisdom. Heaney's first translation was of the Irish lyric poem Buile Suibhne, published as Sweeney Astray: A Version from the Irish (1984). He took up this character and connection in poems published in Station Island (1984). Heaney's prize-winning translation of Beowulf (Farrar, Straus & Giroux, 2000, Whitbread Book of the Year Award) was considered groundbreaking in its use of modern language melded with the original Anglo-Saxon "music".

Plays and prose
His plays include The Cure at Troy: A Version of Sophocles' Philoctetes (1991). Heaney's 2004 play, The Burial at Thebes, suggests parallels between Creon and the foreign policies of the Bush administration.

Heaney's engagement with poetry as a necessary engine for cultural and personal change is reflected in his prose works The Redress of Poetry (1995) and Finders Keepers: Selected Prose, 1971–2001 (2002). 
"When a poem rhymes," Heaney wrote, "when a form generates itself, when a metre provokes consciousness into new postures, it is already on the side of life. When a rhyme surprises and extends the fixed relations between words, that in itself protests against necessity. When language does more than enough, as it does in all achieved poetry, it opts for the condition of overlife, and rebels at limit."He continues: "The vision of reality which poetry offers should be transformative, more than just a printout of the given circumstances of its time and place". Often overlooked and underestimated in the direction of his work is his profound poetic debts to and critical engagement with 20th-century Eastern European poets, and in particular Nobel laureate Czesław Miłosz.

Use in the school syllabus
Heaney's work is used extensively in the school syllabus internationally, including the anthologies The Rattle Bag (1982) and The School Bag (1997) (both edited with Ted Hughes). Originally entitled The Faber Book of Verse for Younger People on the Faber contract, Hughes and Heaney decided the main purpose of The Rattle Bag was to offer enjoyment to the reader: "Arbitrary riches." Heaney commented "the book in our heads was something closer to The Fancy Free Poetry Supplement." It included work that they would have liked to encountered sooner in their own lives, as well as nonsense rhymes, ballad-type poems, riddles, folk songs and rhythmical jingles. Much familiar canonical work was not included, since they took it for granted that their audience would know the standard fare. Fifteen years later, The School Bag aimed at something different. The foreword stated that they wanted "less of a carnival, more like a checklist." It included poems in English, Irish, Welsh, Scots and Scots Gaelic, together with work reflecting the African-American experience.

Legacy

The Seamus Heaney HomePlace, in Bellaghy, is a literary and arts centre which commemorates Heaney's legacy.

In 2017, it was announced that following an approach by the writer to the Heaney family, Fintan O'Toole had been authorised to write a biography of the poet, with access to family-held records. O'Toole had been somewhat acquainted with Heaney, and Heaney had, according to his son, admired O'Toole's work.

His literary papers are held by the National Library of Ireland.

In November 2019, the documentary Seamus Heaney and the music of what happens was aired on BBC Two. His wife Marie and his children talked about their family life and read some of the poems he wrote for them. For the first time, Heaney's four brothers remembered their childhood and the shared experiences that inspired many of his finest poems.

Publications

Poetry: Main Collections
 1966: Death of a Naturalist, Faber & Faber
 1969: Door into the Dark, Faber & Faber
 1972: Wintering Out, Faber & Faber
 1975: North, Faber & Faber
 1979: Field Work, Faber & Faber
 1984: Station Island, Faber & Faber
 1987: The Haw Lantern, Faber & Faber
 1991: Seeing Things, Faber & Faber
 1996: The Spirit Level, Faber & Faber
 2001: Electric Light, Faber & Faber
 2006: District and Circle, Faber & Faber
 2010: Human Chain, Faber & Faber

Poetry: Selected Editions
 1980: Selected Poems 1965–1975, Faber & Faber
 1990: New Selected Poems 1966–1987, Faber & Faber
 1998: Opened Ground: Poems 1966–1996, Faber & Faber
 2014: New Selected Poems 1988–2013, Faber & Faber
 2018: 100 Poems, Faber & Faber

Prose: Main Collections
 1980: Preoccupations: Selected Prose 1968–1978, Faber & Faber
 1988: The Government of the Tongue, Faber & Faber
 1995: The Redress of Poetry: Oxford Lectures, Faber & Faber

Prose: Selected Editions
 2002: Finders Keepers: Selected Prose 1971–2001, Faber & Faber

Plays
 1990: The Cure at Troy: A version of Sophocles' Philoctetes, Field Day
 2004: The Burial at Thebes: A version of Sophocles' Antigone, Faber & Faber

Translations
 1983: Sweeney Astray: A version from the Irish, Field Day
 1992: Sweeney's Flight (with Rachel Giese, photographer), Faber & Faber
 1993: The Midnight Verdict: Translations from the Irish of Brian Merriman and from the Metamorphoses of Ovid, Gallery Press
 1995: Laments, a cycle of Polish Renaissance elegies by Jan Kochanowski, translated with Stanisław Barańczak, Faber & Faber
 1999: Beowulf: A New Verse Translation, Faber & Faber
 1999: Diary of One Who Vanished, a song cycle by Leoš Janáček of poems by Ozef Kalda, Faber & Faber
 2009: The Testament of Cresseid & Seven Fables, Faber & Faber
 2016:  Aeneid: Book VI, Faber & Faber
 2022: The Translations, Faber & Faber

Limited Editions and Booklets (poetry, prose, and translations)
 1965: Eleven Poems, Queen's University
 1968: The Island People, BBC
 1968: Room to Rhyme, Arts Council N.I.
 1969: A Lough Neagh Sequence, Phoenix
 1970: Night Drive, Gilbertson
 1970: A Boy Driving His Father to Confession, Sceptre Press
 1973: Explorations, BBC
 1975: Stations, Ulsterman Publications
 1975: Bog Poems, Rainbow Press
 1975: The Fire i' the Flint, Oxford University Press
 1976: Four Poems, Crannog Press
 1977: Glanmore Sonnets, Editions Monika Beck
 1977: In Their Element, Arts Council N.I.
 1978: Robert Lowell: A Memorial Address and an Elegy, Faber & Faber
 1978: The Makings of a Music, University of Liverpool
 1978: After Summer, Gallery Press
 1979: Hedge School, Janus Press
 1979: Ugolino, Carpenter Press
 1979: Gravities, Charlotte Press
 1979: A Family Album, Byron Press
 1980: Toome, National College of Art and Design
 1981: Sweeney Praises the Trees, Henry Pearson
 1982: A Personal Selection, Ulster Museum
 1982: Poems and a Memoir, Limited Editions Club
 1983: An Open Letter, Field Day
 1983: Among Schoolchildren, Queen's University
 1984: Verses for a Fordham Commencement, Nadja Press
 1984: Hailstones, Gallery Press
 1985: From the Republic of Conscience, Amnesty International
 1985: Place and Displacement, Dove Cottage
 1985: Towards a Collaboration, Arts Council N.I.
 1986: Clearances, Cornamona Press
 1988: Readings in Contemporary Poetry, DIA Art Foundation
 1988: The Sounds of Rain, Emory University
 1988: The Dark Wood, Colin Smythe 
 1989: An Upstairs Outlook, Linen Hall Library
 1989: The Place of Writing, Emory University
 1990: The Tree Clock, Linen Hall Library
 1991: Squarings, Hieroglyph Editions
 1992: Dylan the Durable, Bennington College
 1992: The Gravel Walks, Lenoir Rhyne College
 1992: The Golden Bough, Bonnefant Press
 1993: Keeping Going, Bow and Arrow Press
 1993: Joy or Night, University of Swansea
 1994: Extending the Alphabet, Memorial University of Newfoundland
 1994: Speranza in Reading, University of Tasmania
 1995: Oscar Wilde Dedication, Westminster Abbey
 1995: Charles Montgomery Monteith, All Souls College
 1995: Crediting Poetry: The Nobel Lecture, Gallery Press
 1996: Commencement Address, UNC Chapel Hill
 1997: Poet to Blacksmith, Pim Witteveen
 1997: An After Dinner Speech, Atlantic Foundation
 1998: Audenesque, Maeght
 1999: The Light of the Leaves, Bonnefant Press
 1999: Ballynahinch Lake, Sonzogni
 2001: Something to Write Home About, Flying Fox
 2001: Towers, Trees, Terrors, Università degli Studi di Urbino
 2002: The Whole Thing: on the Good of Poetry, The Recorder
 2002: Hope and History, Rhodes University
 2002: A Keen for the Coins, Lenoir Rhyne College
 2002: Hallaig, Sorley MacLean Trust
 2002: Arion, a poem by Alexander Pushkin, translated from the Russian, with a note by Olga Carlisle, Arion Press
 2003: Eclogues in Extremis, Royal Irish Academy
 2003: Squarings, Arion Press
 2004: Anything can Happen, Town House Publishers
 2004: Room to Rhyme, University of Dundee
 2004: The Testament of Cresseid, Enitharmon Press
 2004: Columcille The Scribe, The Royal Irish Academy
 2005: A Tribute to Michael McLaverty, Linen Hall Library
 2005: The Door Stands Open, Irish Writers Centre
 2005: A Shiver, Clutag Press
 2007: The Riverbank Field, Gallery Press
 2008: Articulations, Royal Irish Academy
 2008: One on a Side, Robert Frost Foundation
 2009: Spelling It Out, Gallery Press
 2010: Writer & Righter, Irish Human Rights Commission
 2012: Stone From Delphi, Arion Press
 2013: The Last Walk, Gallery Press
 2019: My Yeats, Yeats Society Sligo

Spoken word
 2009: Collected Poems (audio recording by Heaney), RTÉ with the Lannan Foundation

Prizes and honours
 1966 Eric Gregory Award
 1967 Cholmondeley Award
 1968 Somerset Maugham Award
 1968 Geoffrey Faber Memorial Prize
 1975 E. M. Forster Award
 1975 Duff Cooper Prize for North
 1995 Nobel Prize in Literature
 1996 Commandeur de l'Ordre des Arts et des Lettres
 1997 Elected Saoi of Aosdána
 1998 St. Louis Literary Award from the Saint Louis University Library Associates
2000 Elected to the American Philosophical Society
 2001 Golden Wreath of Poetry, given by Struga Poetry Evenings for life achievement in the field of poetry
 2004 Kenyon Review Award for Literary Achievement
 2005 Irish PEN Award
 2006 T. S. Eliot Prize for District and Circle
 2007 Poetry Now Award for District and Circle
 2009 David Cohen Prize
 2011 Poetry Now Award for Human Chain
 2011 Bob Hughes Lifetime Achievement Award
 2012 Griffin Poetry Prize, Lifetime Recognition Award

See also

 List of Nobel laureates in Literature
 List of people on stamps of Ireland

References

External links

  including the Nobel Lecture on 7 December 1995 Crediting Poetry

 Seamus Heaney at the Poetry Foundation
 Seamus Heaney at the Poetry Archive
 Seamus Heaney at the Academy for American Poets
 
BBC Your Paintings in partnership PCF. Painting by Peter Edwards

 
  Lannan Foundation reading and conversation with Dennis O'Driscoll, 1 October 2003. (Audio / video – 40 mins). Prose transcript.
 1998 Whiting Writers' Award Keynote Speech
 Seamus Heaney: Man of Words and Grace November–December 2013.
 "History and the homeland" video from The New Yorker. 15 October 2008. Paul Muldoon, interviews Heaney. (1 hr).
 Archival material at 

1939 births
2013 deaths
20th-century writers from Northern Ireland
21st-century writers from Northern Ireland
Alumni of Queen's University Belfast
Castledawson Gaelic footballers
Saoithe
David Cohen Prize recipients
Essayists from Northern Ireland
Fellows of the Royal Society of Literature
Fellows of St John's College, Oxford
Formalist poets
Harvard University faculty
Translators from Northern Ireland
Nobel laureates from Northern Ireland
Nobel laureates in Literature
Struga Poetry Evenings Golden Wreath laureates
People educated at St Columb's College
People from County Londonderry
Writers from Dublin (city)
Translators from Irish
Translators from Old English
Translators from Polish
Translators from Scottish Gaelic
Translators of Brian Merriman
Translators to English
20th-century dramatists and playwrights from Northern Ireland
20th-century poets from Northern Ireland
20th-century Irish poets
Male poets from Northern Ireland
21st-century dramatists and playwrights from Northern Ireland
21st-century poets from Northern Ireland
Members of the Royal Irish Academy
Oxford Professors of Poetry
Irish PEN Award for Literature winners
20th-century translators
21st-century translators
Male dramatists and playwrights from Northern Ireland
Male essayists
20th-century essayists
21st-century essayists
Male writers from Northern Ireland
Commandeurs of the Ordre des Arts et des Lettres
T. S. Eliot Prize winners
Corresponding Fellows of the British Academy
Members of the American Philosophical Society